Give Us a Break may refer to:

 Give Us a Break (Arrogance album), 1973
 Give Us a Break (Limpopo album), 1995
 Give Us a Break (Proctor and Bergman album), 1978
 Give Us a Break (TV series), a 1983 BBC comedy series starring Paul McGann
"Give Us a Break", Joe Brown song